In the branch of mathematics known as real analysis, the Darboux integral is constructed using Darboux sums and is one possible definition of the integral of a function. Darboux integrals are equivalent to Riemann integrals, meaning that a function is Darboux-integrable if and only if it is Riemann-integrable, and the values of the two integrals, if they exist, are equal. The definition of the Darboux integral has the advantage of being easier to apply in computations or proofs than that of the Riemann integral. Consequently, introductory textbooks on calculus and real analysis often develop Riemann integration using the Darboux integral, rather than the true Riemann integral.  Moreover, the definition is readily extended to defining Riemann–Stieltjes integration.  Darboux integrals are named after their inventor, Gaston Darboux (1842–1917).

Definition
The definition of the Darboux integral considers upper and lower (Darboux) integrals, which exist for any bounded real-valued function  on the interval  The Darboux integral exists if and only if the upper and lower integrals are equal.  The upper and lower integrals are in turn the infimum and supremum, respectively, of upper and lower (Darboux) sums which over- and underestimate, respectively, the "area under the curve." In particular, for a given partition of the interval of integration, the upper and lower sums add together the areas of rectangular slices whose heights are the supremum and infimum, respectively, of f in each subinterval of the partition.  These ideas are made precise below:

Darboux sums

A partition of an interval  is a finite sequence of values xi such that

Each interval  is called a subinterval of the partition.  Let  be a bounded function, and let

Let

The lower and upper Darboux sums are often called the lower and upper sums.

Darboux integrals
The upper Darboux integral of f is

The lower Darboux integral of f is

In some literature an integral symbol with an underline and overline represent the lower and upper Darboux integrals respectively.

and like Darboux sums they are sometimes simply called the lower and upper integrals.

If Uf = Lf, then we call the common value the Darboux integral. We also say that f is Darboux-integrable or simply integrable and set

An equivalent and sometimes useful criterion for the integrability of f is to show that for every ε > 0 there exists a partition Pε of  [a, b] such that

Properties
For any given partition, the upper Darboux sum is always greater than or equal to the lower Darboux sum. Furthermore, the lower Darboux sum is bounded below by the rectangle of width (b−a) and height inf(f) taken over [a, b]. Likewise, the upper sum is bounded above by the rectangle of width (b−a) and height sup(f).

The lower and upper Darboux integrals satisfy

Given any c in (a, b)

The lower and upper Darboux integrals are not necessarily linear. Suppose that g:[a, b] → R is also a bounded function, then the upper and lower integrals satisfy the following inequalities.

For a constant c ≥ 0 we have

For a constant c ≤ 0 we have

Consider the function:  then F is Lipschitz continuous. An identical result holds if F is defined using an upper Darboux integral.

Examples

A Darboux-integrable function
Suppose we want to show that the function  is Darboux-integrable on the interval  and determine its value. To do this we partition  into  equally sized subintervals each of length .

Likewise the supremum on any particular subinterval is given by its end point. Thus the lower Darboux sum on a partition  is given by

similarly, the upper Darboux sum is given by

Since

Thus for given any , we have that any partition  with  satisfies 

which shows that  is Darboux integrable. To find the value of the integral note that

A nonintegrable function
Suppose we have the Dirichlet function  defined as 

Thus for any partition  we have

from which we can see that the lower and upper Darboux integrals are unequal.

Refinement of a partition and relation to Riemann integration

A refinement of the partition  is a partition  such that for all i = 0, …, n there is an integer r(i) such that

In other words, to make a refinement, cut the subintervals into smaller pieces and do not remove any existing cuts.

If  is a refinement of  then

and

If P1, P2 are two partitions of the same interval (one need not be a refinement of the other), then

and it follows that

Riemann sums always lie between the corresponding lower and upper Darboux sums.  Formally, if  and  together make a tagged partition

From the previous fact, Riemann integrals are at least as strong as Darboux integrals: if the Darboux integral exists, then the upper and lower Darboux sums corresponding to a sufficiently fine partition will be close to the value of the integral, so any Riemann sum over the same partition will also be close to the value of the integral. There is (see below) a tagged partition that comes arbitrarily close to the value of the upper Darboux integral or lower Darboux integral, and consequently, if the Riemann integral exists, then the Darboux integral must exist as well.

{| class="toccolours collapsible collapsed" width="90%" style="text-align:left"
!Details of finding the tags
|-
|
For this proof, we shall use superscripts to index  and variables related to it.

Let  be a sequence of arbitrary partitions of  such that , whose tags are to be determined. 

By the definition of infimum, for
any , we can always find a  
such that 
Thus, 

Let , we have 

Taking limits of both sides, 

Similarly, (with a different sequences of tags)

Thus, we have

which means that the Darboux integral exist and equals . 

|}

See also
 Regulated integral
 Lebesgue integration
 Minimum bounding rectangle

Notes

References
 
 Darboux integral at Encyclopaedia of Mathematics
 
 

Definitions of mathematical integration